Hoernlé is a surname. Notable people with the surname include:

Rudolf Hoernlé (1841–1918), Indologist and philologist
Winifred Hoernlé (1885–1960), South African anthropologist